William Liller (April 1, 1927, Philadelphia – February 28, 2021) was an American astronomer, known for his research on "planetary nebulae, comets, asteroids, magnetic activity in cool stars, the optical identification of X-ray sources, and astro-archaeology."

Biography
He matriculated in 1944 at Harvard College, where he graduated in 1949 with a bachelor's degree in astronomy, after an 11-month interruption for service in the U.S. Navy from July 1945 to June 1946. He received in 1953 his Ph.D. in astronomy from the University of Michigan. His Ph.D. thesis, supervised by Lawrence H. Aller, dealt with central and the expansion rates of their planetary nebulae. From 1953 to 1960 Liller was a junior faculty member at the University of Michigan. At Harvard University, he became in 1960 a full professor and in 1962 was appointed Robert Wheeler Willson Professor of Applied Astronomy. He discovered two minor planets, several novae, the globular star cluster Liller 1 in Scorpius, and comet C/1988 A1 (Liller).

He was an author of several popular books on the subject of astronomy, a member of the International Astronomical Union, the American Astronomical Society, the American Academy of Arts and Sciences and AAVSO. He was also awarded the Guggenheim Fellowship for Natural Sciences. The minor planet 3222 Liller was named in his honor. In 1991 a festschrift was published in his honor.

In 1981 Liller resigned from Harvard University and became the associate director of the Instituto Isaac Newton with main office in the eastern outskirts of Santiago Chile. He maintained a small but well-equipped observatory in Viña del Mar about 120 kilometers west of Santiago. In 1986 NASA funded Liller's three-month stay on Easter Island, where he set up a small observatory to observe Halley's Comet. During this time he became fascinated with the island's many ancient temples and eventually began a program of archaeoastronomy. He and his Chilean, third wife lived in Reñaca, Chile in a villa on high cliffs overlooking the Pacific Ocean. He was a vice-president of the Easter Island Foundation and an expert on the ancient culture of Rapanui.

His doctoral students include Christine Jones Forman and Debra Elmegreen.

Selected publications

Articles

Books and booklets

References

External links 
 IAU individual members
 William Liller Profile
 Book: The Cambridge guide to astronomical discovery, 1992

1927 births
20th-century American astronomers
Discoverers of asteroids
Discoverers of comets

Harvard University faculty
2021 deaths
University of Michigan alumni
University of Michigan faculty
Harvard College alumni